Franziska Koch (born 13 July 2000 in Mettmann) is a German cyclist, who currently rides for UCI Women's WorldTeam .

Koch started her career at local club RV Edelweiss Mettmann 1906 in 2010. In 2016 she won second place in junior national track championships on the Omnium. In 2017 she returned to win the Omnium national title. That year, she also won the Cross Country national title in mountain biking, and came third in the national junior road championships.

Major results
2019
 4th Overall Festival Elsy Jacobs
1st  Young rider classification
 1st stage 4 Boels Ladies Tour

References

External links

2000 births
Living people
German female cyclists
People from Mettmann
Sportspeople from Düsseldorf (region)
Cyclists from North Rhine-Westphalia
21st-century German women